This is a list of transactions that have taken place during the 2022 P. League+ off-season and the 2022–23 P. League+ season.

Retirement

Front office movements

Head coaching changes
Off-season

In-season

General manager changes
Off-season

Player movements

Trades

Free agents

Going to other Taiwanese leagues

Going overseas

Waived

Draft

References

2022-23
Transactions